Big Sandy Creek may refer to:
Big Sandy Creek (Colorado), a tributary of the Arkansas River
Big Sandy Creek (Montana), a tributary of the Milk River
Big Sandy Creek (Niobrara River tributary), a stream in Holt County, Nebraska
Big Sandy Creek (Sabine River tributary), a tributary in Texas
Big Sandy Creek (Trinity River), a tributary in Texas
Big Sandy Creek (Village Creek), a tributary in Texas
Big Sandy Creek (Cheat River tributary), a tributary in West Virginia
Big Sandy River (Wyoming) or Big Sandy Creek, a tributary of the Green River
Big Sandy Creek (Illinois), a tributary of the Illinois River

See also
Big Sandy River (disambiguation)
Sandy Creek (disambiguation)